124 Squadron is a squadron of the Israeli Air Force, also known as Rolling Sword Squadron.

124 Squadron is a helicopter squadron of S-70A and UH-60 Black Hawks based at Palmachim Airbase. The squadron was briefly assigned two ex-United States Coast Guard Eurocopter HH-65 Dolphin until they were reassigned to the then new 193 Squadron (Israel) in June 1987.

References

Israeli Air Force squadrons